Shawn Matthias (born February 19, 1988) is a Canadian former professional ice hockey forward. Matthias played in the NHL, making appearances with the Florida Panthers, Vancouver Canucks, Toronto Maple Leafs, Colorado Avalanche, and Winnipeg Jets. He was originally drafted by the Detroit Red Wings in the second round, 47th overall, at the 2006 NHL Entry Draft. Matthias was a natural centre early in his career; however, he made the transition to being able to play the wings as well.

Playing career

Junior
Matthias played his major junior ice hockey career with the Belleville Bulls of the Ontario Hockey League (OHL) before he was drafted by the Detroit Red Wings in the second round, 47th overall, in the 2006 NHL Entry Draft. In his first season in the OHL, Matthias stood at 6'2 and 170 pounds. During the following season, 2006–07, his rights were traded, along with conditional draft picks to the Florida Panthers in exchange for Todd Bertuzzi on February 27, 2007.

Professional
On January 18, 2008, the Panthers called up Matthias from Belleville. In his second NHL game on January 19, 2008, he scored his first two goals, both against goaltender Brent Johnson of the Washington Capitals.

On March 4, 2014, Matthias was traded, along with goaltender Jacob Markström, to the Vancouver Canucks in exchange for goaltender Roberto Luongo and Steven Anthony.

On February 13, 2015, Matthias recorded his first career NHL hat-trick in a 5–2 Canucks win over the Boston Bruins.

Despite posting a career-high in goals (18) and points (27) during the 2014–15 season, the Canucks opted not to re-sign Matthias after the expiration of his contract, whereupon on July 6, 2015, he signed a one-year, $2.3 million deal with the Toronto Maple Leafs as an unrestricted free agent. Following the signing, Matthias expressed via Twitter that he was a Maple Leafs fan growing up and that he "couldn't be happier to play for [his] hometown team."

In the 2015–16 season, Matthias made his Maple Leaf debut on opening night in a 3-1 defeat to the Montreal Canadiens on October 7, 2015. Throughout the year, Matthias failed to score at a pace similar to his prior season in Vancouver, but was still seen as a decent producer given his role on the team. After contributing with 17 points in 51 games, on February 21, 2016, Matthias was traded by the rebuilding Maple Leafs to the Colorado Avalanche in exchange for a 4th round pick in the 2016 Entry Draft (Keaton Middleton) and prospect Colin Smith to bolster Colorado's depth for a playoff push, although the team would ultimately not qualify for the post-season.

On July 1, 2016, Matthias left the Avalanche organization as a free agent, agreeing to a two-year deal with Central Division competitors, the Winnipeg Jets.

International play

Matthias played for Canada at the 2008 World Juniors, where he helped his team win the gold medal.

Career statistics

Regular season and playoffs

International

References

External links

1988 births
Living people
Belleville Bulls players
Canadian ice hockey centres
Colorado Avalanche players
Detroit Red Wings draft picks
EHC Black Wings Linz players
Florida Panthers players
Ice hockey people from Ontario
Rochester Americans players
Sportspeople from Mississauga
Vancouver Canucks players
Toronto Maple Leafs players
Winnipeg Jets players